Deadfall is a 1968 British neo noir crime film written and directed by Bryan Forbes and starring Michael Caine, Eric Portman, Giovanna Ralli and Forbes's wife Nanette Newman, with music by John Barry in his final collaboration with Forbes. Barry also plays a musical conductor in the film. It is based on Desmond Cory's 1965 thriller and shot in and around Majorca, Spain. The film's theme song, "My Love Has Two Faces", was performed by Shirley Bassey.

Plot
Cat burglar Henry Clarke checks himself into a Spanish sanatorium for alcoholics under a false pretence. His true motivation is to get closer to a wealthy patient named Salinas and then rob his magnificent house.

Clarke is approached by Fé Moreau and her much older husband, Richard, to form an alliance. As a test run before the real robbery, they break into another stately home. After risking his life on a ledge, Clarke becomes so angered by Richard's failure to crack the safe that, with great effort, he drags the entire safe and its contents out of the house.

Fé and Clarke begin a romantic affair, which Richard, who has a young male lover, does not discourage. Fé buys a new Jaguar convertible for Clarke and tells him the safe contained jewels worth at least $500,000.

Before the time comes to rob Salinas's mansion, Fé travels to Tangier without letting Clarke know she was leaving. Richard then tells Clarke a harrowing tale of how he once betrayed his male lover to the Nazis and later impregnated the man's wife. Their baby was Fé, but, choosing not to tell her that she was his daughter, Richard married her.

A contemptuous Clarke decides to break into Salinas's mansion on his own. Fé returns and is shocked when a suicidal and depressed Richard reveals the truth about their relationship. She races to the Salinas mansion and inadvertently alerts a guard, who shoots Clarke coming out a window. He falls to his death.

Fé attends a funeral. Afterwards, she is led off by police while Richard's Homosexual lover drives off in Clarke's car.

Cast
 Michael Caine as Henry Clarke
 Giovanna Ralli as Fe
 Eric Portman as Moreau 
 Nanette Newman as The Girl
 Vladek Sheybal as Dr. Delgado
 Emilio Rodríguez as Police Captain (as Emilio Rodriguez)
 David Buck as Salinas
 Carmen Dene as Masseuse
 Geraldine Sherman as Receptionlist
 Leonard Rossiter as Fillmore 
 Red Howell as Spanish Chauffeur 
 John Barry as Orchestra Conductor
 Renata Tarragó as Solo Guitarist (as Renata Tarrago)
 Carlos Pierre as Antonio 
 Santiago Rivero as Armed Guard

Reception
The movie received a positive review in the New York Times.

Box office
According to Fox records the film required $5,350,000 in rentals to break even and by 11 December 1970 had made $2,575,000 so made a loss to the studio.

Soundtrack
 "My Love Has Two Faces," Music by John Barry, Lyrics by Jack Lawrence, Sung by Shirley Bassey
 "Romance for Guitar and Orchestra," Composed and conducted by John Barry, Performed by Renata Tarragó
 "Beat Girl," Composed by John Barry

References

External links
 
 
 

1968 films
1968 crime drama films
1968 romantic drama films
1968 LGBT-related films
1960s heist films
British crime drama films
British romantic drama films
British heist films
Films based on British novels
Films directed by Bryan Forbes
Films scored by John Barry (composer)
Films shot at Pinewood Studios
LGBT-related romantic drama films
1960s English-language films
1960s British films
British LGBT-related films

bg:Примка
de:Deadfall
nl:Deadfall